Ukrainian Orthodox Church may refer to:

Currently existing churches

Mainly in Ukraine 

Orthodox Church of Ukraine (OCU), established by a union of the Ukrainian Orthodox Church – Kyiv Patriarchate (UOC-KP), Ukrainian Autocephalous Orthodox Church (UAOC), and some members of the Ukrainian Orthodox Church (Moscow Patriarchate) (UOC-MP) on 15 December 2018
Ukrainian Orthodox Church – Kyiv Patriarchate (UOC-KP) (1992–December 15, 2018; 20 June 2019–), which reestablished its independence by declaring itself independent from the Orthodox Church of Ukraine on 20 June 2019 after a conflict within the OCU.
Ukrainian Orthodox Church (Moscow Patriarchate) (1990–), a church which established independence from the Russian Orthodox Church; the church was previously as an autonomous church under jurisdiction of the Russian Orthodox Church
Ukrainian Autocephalous Orthodox Church Canonical (UAOC-C) (1924–) with canonical origin from the Polish Orthodox Church
Ukrainian Orthodox Greek Catholic Church (2008–), an independent Ukrainian Greek Catholic Church that was established from the official Ukrainian Greek Catholic Church, which self-identifies as both Orthodox and Catholic
 (2001–), a church which includes elements from Orthodoxy and the Reformation

Outside or mainly outside of Ukraine 

Ukrainian Orthodox Church of Canada, under jurisdiction of the Ecumenical Patriarchate of Constantinople
Ukrainian Orthodox Church of the USA, under jurisdiction of the Ecumenical Patriarchate of Constantinople
Ukrainian Orthodox Vicariate Sighetu Marmației, a vicariate of the Romanian Orthodox Church serving Eastern Orthodox believers from Romania's Ukrainian community

Historical Churches 

 For the Orthodox church in Ukraine before the 20th century, see: List of Metropolitans and Patriarchs of Kiev and Metropolitan of Kiev and all Rus'
 Ukrainian Autonomous Orthodox Church (1941–44), a short-lived Ukrainian church that existed when Ukraine was occupied by Nazi Germany during the Second World War
 Living Church (May 1922–July 26, 1946), an independent liberal church
 Ukrainian Autocephalous Orthodox Church (1922–December 15, 2018), dissolved itself  to form the Orthodox Church of Ukraine

See also
 History of Christianity in Ukraine
 Ukrainian Church (disambiguation)
 Ukrainian Catholic Church (disambiguation)
 Ukrainians (disambiguation)
 Ukrainian (disambiguation)
 Ukraine (disambiguation)
 2018 Moscow–Constantinople schism
Autocephaly of the Orthodox Church of Ukraine